Mylène Freeman (born March 7, 1989) is a former Canadian politician who was the New Democratic Party (NDP) Member of Parliament for the riding of Argenteuil—Papineau—Mirabel in Quebec. She was elected in the 2011 Canadian federal election after defeating incumbent Mario Laframboise of the Bloc Québécois.

Biography
Born in Stouffville, Ontario, she is fluent in both French and English.  She grew up fluently bilingual; she is the daughter of an Irish Canadian father and a French Canadian mother.

She holds a Bachelor of Arts from McGill University, where she studied political theory. She was co-president of the university's New Democratic Party student group and co-ordinator of the university's Women in House program, which has young women shadow female MPs in hopes of fostering their interest in getting involved in politics.

In the 2009 Montreal municipal election, Freeman stood on behalf of Projet Montréal in Outremont as a candidate for borough councillor in Claude-Ryan.

Freeman defeated Bloc Québécois MP Mario Laframboise by 8,000 votes in Argenteuil—Papineau—Mirabel in the 2011 federal election. She was one of five McGill students, alongside Charmaine Borg, Laurin Liu, Matthew Dubé and Jamie Nicholls, elected to Parliament in the 2011 election following the NDP's unexpected mid-campaign surge in Quebec. In 2015, NDP leader Tom Mulcair named her to the shadow cabinet as critic for the status of women. She succeeded Niki Ashton, who was reassigned to be critic for Aboriginal affairs.

Amid a drop in support for the NDP in the 2015 election, Dubé was re-elected while Freeman and the other three were defeated. Following her defeat, Freeman went on to pursue doctoral studies at the University of Virginia.

Electoral record

Source: Elections Canada

References

External links

Web Site

1989 births
Anglophone Quebec people
Canadian people of Irish descent
Women members of the House of Commons of Canada
Franco-Ontarian people
Living people
McGill University alumni
Members of the House of Commons of Canada from Quebec
New Democratic Party MPs
Quebec people of Irish descent
People from Whitchurch-Stouffville
Women in Quebec politics
21st-century Canadian politicians
21st-century Canadian women politicians